Daniel Robert Bowry (born 29 April 1998) is a professional footballer who plays as a defender for National League South side Worthing. Born in England, he represents the Antigua and Barbuda national team internationally.

Club career
After joining Charlton Athletic at the age of 16, Bowry signed his first professional contract on 22 April 2016.

In April 2018, Bowry joined Kingstonian on loan until the end of the season. He made his debut for the club in a 1–0 win over Wingate & Finchley.

On 27 July 2018, Bowry joined Hampton & Richmond Borough on loan until 1 January 2019. On 19 September 2018 he was recalled from his loan.

On 4 July 2019, Bowry joined Cheltenham Town after being released by Charlton Athletic at the end of the 2018–19 season.

On 18 October, Bowry joined Bath City on an initial month's loan.

On 5 March 2021, Bowry joined National League side Wealdstone on an initial one-month loan. Bowry made his debut against Halifax on 6 March 2021, being sent off in stoppage time of that game

Following a season in the National League with King's Lynn Town in which the side were relegated, Bowry joined newly promoted National League South club Worthing on 30 July 2022, Scoring his first goal for the club Vs Slough Town FC on 29 October 2022

International career
On 20 March 2018, Bowry was called up to the Antigua and Barbuda for a pair of friendlies against Bermuda and Jamaica. He made his debut in a 3–2 win over Bermuda on 21 March 2018.

Personal life
Bowry's paternal grandfather was born in Saint Kitts and Nevis while his paternal grandmother was born in Antigua, Antigua and Barbuda. His father, Bobby Bowry, was born in England and was also a professional footballer who represented the Saint Kitts and Nevis national team.

Career statistics

Club

International

Scores and results Antigua and Barbuda's goal tally first, score column indicates score after each Bowry goal.

Honours

Cheltenham Town
League Two Champions: 2020-21

References

External links
 CAFC Profile
 World Football Profile

1998 births
Living people
Footballers from Greater London
Antigua and Barbuda footballers
Antigua and Barbuda international footballers
English footballers
Antigua and Barbuda people of English descent
Antigua and Barbuda people of Saint Kitts and Nevis descent
English sportspeople of Antigua and Barbuda descent
English sportspeople of Saint Kitts and Nevis descent
Association football defenders
Charlton Athletic F.C. players
Kingstonian F.C. players
Hampton & Richmond Borough F.C. players
Cheltenham Town F.C. players
Bath City F.C. players
Wealdstone F.C. players
King's Lynn Town F.C. players
Worthing F.C. players